The Donna Reed Show is an American sitcom starring Donna Reed as the middle-class housewife Donna Stone. Carl Betz co-stars as her pediatrician husband Dr. Alex Stone, and Shelley Fabares and Paul Petersen as their teenage children, Mary and Jeff. The show originally aired on ABC from September 24, 1958, to September 3, 1966.

Background 
The series was sponsored by Campbell Soup Company, with Johnson & Johnson as the principal alternate sponsor (succeeded in the fall of 1963 by The Singer Company).  

This show was the first TV family sitcom to feature the mother as the center of the show. Reed's character, Donna Stone, is a loving mother and wife, but also a strong woman, an active participant in her community, a woman with feelings and a sense of humor. According to many of Reed's friends and family, Reed shared many similarities to the character that she portrayed on screen, implying that the fictional Donna Stone was a near-identical copy of Reed herself.

In a 2008 interview, Paul Petersen (Jeff Stone) stated:
[The Donna Reed Show] depicts a better time and place. It has a sort of level of intelligence and professionalism that is sadly lacking in current entertainment products. The messages it sent out were positive and uplifting. The folks you saw were likable, the family was fun, the situations were familiar to people. It provided 22-and-a-half-minutes of moral instructions and advice on how to deal with the little dilemmas of life. Jeff and Mary and their friends had all the same problems that real kids in high school did.
Petersen continued,
That's what the show was really about, the importance of family. That's where life's lessons are transmitted, generation to generation. There's a certain way in which these are transmitted, with love and affection.

Cast changes 
In season 5, (1963) Mary departed for college, reducing Fabares's appearances, something which continued yearly with her role becoming a minor character. Fabares left the full-time cast to pursue opportunities in films. She eventually returned seven times for guest appearances (Season 6 episodes 8, 11, 14; Season 7 episodes 5, 15, 30; Season 8 episode 13). Following Fabares's departure, Petersen's real-life sister Patty Petersen joined the show as Trisha, a runaway orphan eventually adopted by the Stones.  The program achieved its highest Nielsen ratings in Season 6, reaching #16 after Fabares' departure. A possible reason for higher ratings was the addition of new characters, Ann McCrea and disc jockey-turned actor Bob Crane as the Stones' neighbors, Midge and Dave Kelsey. This not only provided both Donna and Alex with best friends, but co-conspirators, as well. So popular were their roles that by the fall of 1964, both McCrea and Crane began receiving billing in the opening credits of the program.  Crane left the series in 1965 to star in the CBS sitcom Hogan's Heroes. As a result, he was written out of the show although his character continued to be referred to and McCrea's character remained with the program. Also, towards the end of the series, actor Darryl Richard was regularly featured as Jeff Stone's best friend, Morton "Smitty" Smith. Richard first appeared in 1962 and "Smitty" became a major character after Season 6. Janet Landgard was a series regular from 1963 to 1965 as Karen Holmby.

Characters and cast

Main
Donna Stone (Donna Reed)
Alex Stone (Carl Betz)
Mary Stone (Shelley Fabares)
Jeff Stone (Paul Petersen)
Trisha (Patty Petersen)

Secondary

Dr. Dave Kelsey (Bob Crane) and his wife Midge (Ann McCrea) are friends of the Stones. Dave, Alex's colleague, appeared for the first time on March 14, 1963, in the episode "The Two Doctor Stones". Dave continued on the series until 1965; Midge appeared from 1963 to 1966. Crane's character was written out of the show at the end of season 7 when he was cast in the CBS series, Hogan's Heroes.  McCrea remained with the show until its conclusion.
 David Barker (Charles Herbert) – a young military school student who the Stones look after in many episodes. David is very disobedient and troubled in the beginning but the Stone family soon grow to love and reform him.
Uncle Bo (Jack Kelk)
Morton "Smitty" Smith (Darryl Richard)
Zachary Blake (Stephen Pearson)
Herbie Bailey (Tommy Ivo)
Scotty (Jimmy Hawkins). Hawkins' character returned to the show in season 3 as 'Scotty', one of Mary's dates (for seasons 3–4) then as 'Jerry' for seasons 7 & 8 (his last appearance was in December, 1965).  
Roger (Jan Stine)
Angie (Candy Moore) is Jeff's girlfriend in several fourth season episodes.  Moore returned to the program during season 8 as Jeff's 'new' girlfriend Bernice/Bebe, in episodes  3, 12, 16, & 19. Moore had just finished 3 seasons playing Lucille Ball's teenaged daughter Chris on The Lucy Show.  Moore was written out after season 3 (1965).  Moore had acted on the program from 1962 to 1965.  'The Lucy Show' was her last acting assignment as a major character on a regular network program.
Babs (Melinda Plowman) is Mary's first season best girlfriend.
Mr. and Mrs. Wilgus (Howard McNear and Kathleen Freeman)
Lydia Langley (Mary Shipp)

Guest stars

The Donna Reed Show featured several celebrity guest stars appearing as themselves during its eight-year run. Baseball player Don Drysdale appeared in four episodes while Willie Mays appeared in three episodes and Leo Durocher once. Musician Harry James and singers Tony Martin and Lesley Gore appeared as themselves. Gore was featured in the series' finale, "By-Line—Jeff Stone", on March 19, 1966. Lassie and film director George Sidney appear as themselves in the 1961 episode "The Stones Go To Hollywood". The episode plugged Sidney's then current feature film, Pepe, in which Reed made a cameo appearance. Teen heartthrob James Darren guest starred as a pop singer with the measles.

Child actor Charles Herbert also had a recurring guest role in four episodes as David Barker, a runaway child whom the Stones assist. In the 1960 crossover episode "Donna Decorates", Jay North appeared with his Dennis the Menace co-star, Joseph Kearns as Mr. George Wilson. Esther Williams guest starred as Molly, a fashion designer and friend of Donna's who is herself about to marry a doctor in "The Career Woman" (1960). In real life, Williams and Reed had been close friends since the early 1940s, when they were rising MGM contract stars.

Several actors guest starred numerous times in different roles including Richard Deacon, Gale Gordon, Harvey Korman, Miyoshi Umeki, Doodles Weaver, and Dick Wilson.

As Fabares co-starred in the Mickey Mouse Club serial Annette before the Donna Reed Show, four other Annette co-stars (Deacon, Cheryl Holdridge, Doreen Tracey & Mary Wickes) would also make respective guest appearances on this show.

Other notable guest stars include:

 Lee Aaker
 Jack Albertson
 John Astin
 Binnie Barnes
 Raymond Bailey
 Bobby Buntrock 
 Bobby Burgess
 Harry Cheshire
 Dabney Coleman
 Hans Conried
 Richard Conte
 Ellen Corby
 Johnny Crawford
 Esther Dale
 Kim Darby
 Margaret Dumont
 Stuart Erwin
 Tiger Fafara 
 Jamie Farr
 Florida Friebus
 Harold Gould
 George Hamilton
 Arte Johnson
 DeForest Kelley
 Ted Knight
 Sheila James Kuehl
 Charles Lane
 Cloris Leachman
 Alice Pearce
 Gigi Perreau
 Marion Ross
 William Schallert 
 Hal Smith
 James Stacy 
 Tisha Sterling
 Olive Sturgess
 Stephen Talbot
 Marlo Thomas
 Mary Treen
 Jesse White
 Rhys Williams
 William Windom 
 Estelle Winwood 
 Will Wright

Episodes

Home media
For a limited time in 2004, General Mills offered a DVD of two episodes inside boxes of Total cereal and Oatmeal Crisp. Virgil Films and Entertainment (under license from the estates of Donna Reed and Tony Owen) released the first three seasons of the show on DVD in Region 1. Virgil also released a four-episode "best of" DVD on April 13, 2010.

On December 17, 2010, it was announced that MPI Home Video had acquired the rights to release seasons 4 and 5 of The Donna Reed Show.  Season 4 was subsequently released on December 20, 2011, and Season 5 was released on December 4, 2012.

On September 30, 2014, MPI Home Video re-released the first season on DVD.  Season 2 was re-released on March 24, 2015.  Season 3 was re-released on June 30, 2015.

, the show's sixth, seventh, and eighth (the final) seasons are yet to be released on DVD.

Awards and nominations

In popular culture
In Gilmore Girls season 1 episode 14 "That Damn Donna Reed", Rory and her boyfriend Dean have a disagreement about women's roles after watching an episode of the show. The episode involved Reed's character making a lot of food.  Later, Rory dresses up in a dress like Donna Reed and serves Dean a steak dinner.

In the film Major Payne, the theme song to the show plays as Payne fantasizes about an idyllic family life with Emily and Tiger.

References

External links 

 
 

1958 American television series debuts
1966 American television series endings
1950s American sitcoms
1960s American sitcoms
American Broadcasting Company original programming
Black-and-white American television shows
English-language television shows
Television series about families
Television series by Screen Gems